Dekemhare (sometimes spelled Decamare) is a town in Eritrea, lying south east of Asmara. Developed as an industrial center, it became a large scale industrial and transportation city, known for its vineyards but was partly destroyed in the Eritrean War of Independence.

History

The settlement of Dequ-Mehari, now perched above the town of Dekemhare, was founded in the 15th century as a small-scale agricultural community. It was previously overshadowed by the nearby settlement of Gura, which was the location of several battles (including a major one during the 19th century Ethio-Egyptian War) and previously gave its name to Dequ-Mehari's valley. Following their invasion, the Italians devoted significant resources into developing Gura and Dekemhare as an important transportation center.  Gura received an air base and a major road was built connecting Dekamhare with the port Nefasit. The Italians built a number of contemporary services in the town.  The town became a major base of operations for the Italian military in the war against Ethiopia.  The town became a key agricultural center for Italian East Africa, mainly with wine vineyards, but also pasta and bread factories.

The Italian influence was significant and many buildings built between 1936 and 1938 display a distinctive art deco style.  In 1938, the town had 12,000 residents, including 6,000 permanent Italian residents. 

During World War II, as the British took control over the region, many of the Italian residents left.  Ethnic violence in 1947 resulted in most of rest of the Italian residents leaving Dekemhare.  The industrial production of the city did not resume after the British turned over the region to Ethiopia in 1951, and there were persistent rumors that efforts by major international companies to build factories were stopped by the Haile Selassie government. 

During the Eritrean War of Independence (1961-1991), the town was the center of organizing and military action by the Eritrean Liberation Front (ELF). A site of early military actions between the Eritrean Liberation Front and the Ethiopian government, the town became controlled by rebel factions in 1977 who made it a primary organizing location. However, the town became controlled by Ethiopian forces again when the now united Eritrean People's Liberation Front (EPLF) retreated from the territory.  The town became a major location of violence during the remained of the wars including regular fighting between forces, aerial bombardment and shelling.  Much of the population fled during the intense fighting in 1990 and 1991.  On May 21, 1991, the EPLF took over Dekemhare which caused a disorganized retreat of Ethiopian troops and victory over Asmara and the end of large-scale military fighting.

References 

 
Southern Region (Eritrea)
Populated places in Eritrea